Vardenis is a village in the Aparan Municipality of the Aragatsotn Province of Armenia. The town has a 19th-century church.

References 

Populated places in Aragatsotn Province